Gwynneth "Gwyn" Coogan (born Gwynneth Hardesty; August 21, 1965 in Trenton, New Jersey) is an American former Olympic athlete, educator and mathematician.

Hardesty attended Phillips Exeter Academy for two years, where she played squash and field hockey. She then attended Smith College, graduating in 1987, where she majored in math and took up running for the first time, and became the two-time NCAA Division III champion in the 3,000 meters. She qualified for the 1992 Summer Olympics in Barcelona, where she competed in the 10,000 meters. Four years later, she was an alternate for the women's marathon for the 1996 Summer Olympics in Atlanta.  She was the 1998 United States National Champion in the Marathon.

Early and personal life
Coogan went on to earn her Ph.D. in math from the University of Colorado in 1999, working primarily in number theory. She did post-doctorate work with Ken Ono at the University of Wisconsin–Madison, taught at Hood College, and currently teaches math at Phillips Exeter Academy.

Achievements

References

1965 births
Living people
American female long-distance runners
Athletes (track and field) at the 1995 Pan American Games
Athletes (track and field) at the 1992 Summer Olympics
Olympic track and field athletes of the United States
Mathematics educators
Phillips Exeter Academy alumni
Phillips Exeter Academy faculty
Smith Pioneers track and field athletes
Hood College faculty
University of Colorado alumni
University of Wisconsin–Madison alumni
Sportspeople from Trenton, New Jersey
Goodwill Games medalists in athletics
Competitors at the 1994 Goodwill Games
Pan American Games track and field athletes for the United States
American women academics
20th-century American women